Priscilla Buxton (25 February 1808 – 18 June 1852) was a British slavery abolitionist. She was co-secretary of the London Female Anti-Slavery Society. In 1833 a petition of 187,000 women's signatures were presented to parliament to end slavery. The first two names were Amelia Opie and Priscilla Buxton.

Life
Buxton was born in Earlham Hall in Norfolk in 1808. Her parents were Hannah (born Gurney) and  Sir Thomas Fowell Buxton, first baronet. Her maternal aunt was Elizabeth Fry and her uncle was Joseph John Gurney.

Buxton served as her fathers special assistant as he led the campaign to end slavery in the British colonies. She also help organise help for educational missionary work in Africa. She was not her father's servant, it was noted that she not only solved problems but also anticipated and identified them.

In 1832 Buxton became the co-secretary of the London Female Anti-Slavery Society. She would not able to join the Anti-Slavery Society, despite it being part founded by her father as only men were allowed to join. She could hear her father speak in parliament but only on the condition that she heard it via a ventilation shaft. Only voters (and other men) were allowed to spectate in the houses of Parliament. Women could raise petitions and Buxton was one of the first of 187,000 that she helped to organise in 1833 against slavery. The petition took two people to carry it, it was the largest ever abolitionist petition and it was laughed at in parliament.

Buxton married the Scottish politician Andrew Johnston who was an ally of her father. Johnston had stood in the reformed  1832 general election where he became the MP for the St Andrews District of Burghs. They chose to get married on 1 August 1834 which was the day that the majority of slaves in the British Empire were legally freed.

They had four children. They were parents of MP Andrew Johnston and grandfather of designer Edward Johnston (the son of his younger son Fowell Buxton Johnston).

Her husband and her father lost their seats in the 1837 election. She and Andrew went to Fife and then returned south where Andrew took a job in the Gurney's Bank. Priscilla died in 1852.

Legacy

Buxton has a plaque raised by Cromer council which advertises their museum. Buxton's journal and letters were published in 1862.

References

1808 births
1852 deaths
People from Norwich (district)
Daughters of baronets